Gijs Jan van Dijk  (born 11 October 1980) is a Dutch politician and former union leader. He was a member of the House of Representatives for the Labour Party between 23 March 2017 and 8 February 2022.

He resigned from the lower house after accusations of undesirable behaviour in the private sphere. A research bureau hired by the party concluded that he had displayed norm-breaking behaviour in and outside the private sphere.  Discussion arose about these conclusions and the handling of the investigation by the Labour Party. In several articles it was discussed whether behavior of politicians in the private sphere should always be part of the public discourse. A commission dedicated to the case concluded that the matter was private and should have stayed that way; his party PvdA made apologies and welcomed Van Dijk back.

References

External links 
 Gijs van Dijk at the website of the House of Representatives
 Gijs van Dijk (in Dutch) at the website of the Labour Party

1980 births
Living people
21st-century Dutch politicians
Dutch trade union leaders
Labour Party (Netherlands) politicians
Members of the House of Representatives (Netherlands)
People from Leiden
20th-century Dutch people